Not news may refer to:
WP:NOTNEWS
Not the Nine O'Clock News, British comedy sketch show (1979–1982)
Not Necessarily the News, American comedy sketch show (1982–1990)
"Not the News", a song from the 2019 album Anima by Thom Yorke